"These Are My Twisted Words" is a song by the English rock band Radiohead. It was leaked via BitTorrent on 12 August 2009, possibly by the band, and released on 17 August as a free download from the Radiohead website.

Release
On 12 August 2009, "These Are My Twisted Words" appeared unannounced on What.CD, a BitTorrent tracker. A text file included in the torrent file contained ASCII art, a cryptic poem and a reference to a release date of 17 August. Commentators including the Guardian and Rolling Stone speculated that Radiohead had leaked the song themselves following the unconventional pay-what-you-want release of their album In Rainbows (2007).

On 17 August, Radiohead released "These Are My Twisted Words" as a free download from their website and through a torrent file hosted by Mininova. The download included several pieces of artwork by Yorke and the longtime Radiohead collaborator Stanley Donwood, with the suggestion to print them on tracing paper. In a blog post announcing the song, the guitarist Jonny Greenwood said it had been recently completed and made no mention of the leak. Radiohead performed "These Are My Twisted Words" on their 2012 King of Limbs tour.

Composition
"These Are My Twisted Words" is composed in a  time signature. It opens with a motorik beat from the drummer, Philip Selway, before Yorke's vocal enters. Daniel Kreps of Rolling Stone noted a krautrock influence and likened the song to the In Rainbows track "Weird Fishes / Arpeggi". Bill Bradley of Vanity Fair said it had a "signature eerie Radiohead sound". Matthew Schnipper of The Fader described it as a "simple song" with "a plodding, stubborn forward spirit".

Reception
Brian Parks of PopMatters gave "These Are My Twisted Words" seven out of ten, describing it as "the most recent in a long line of unconventionally beautiful songs for which Radiohead is renowned". Bradley of Vanity Fair wrote that "all the converted" would like the song. However, Ryan Dombal of Pitchfork wrote that its "nauseous guitars, featherweight motorik beat and vaguely whiny lyrics almost read as parody" and concluded that it "isn't as enticing as its method of distribution". In 2016, Rolling Stone included "These Are My Twisted Words" on its list of "20 insanely great Radiohead songs only hardcore fans know".

References

External links
 

Radiohead songs
2009 singles
Song recordings produced by Nigel Godrich
Songs written by Thom Yorke
Songs written by Colin Greenwood
Songs written by Jonny Greenwood
Songs written by Philip Selway
Songs written by Ed O'Brien
2009 songs